Roman Zub (born 16 February 1967 in Ukraine) is a Ukrainian retired footballer.

References

Ukrainian footballers
Living people
Association football midfielders
1967 births
Association football defenders
FC Karpaty Lviv players
FC Volyn Lutsk players
FC Oleksandriya players
FC Zorya Luhansk players
SKA Lviv players
Legia Warsaw players
FC Sokil Zolochiv players
FC Spartak Ivano-Frankivsk players
FC Nyva Vinnytsia players
FC Zirka Kropyvnytskyi players
Neftçi PFK players